Jane's Intelligence Review is a monthly journal on global security and stability issues published by Jane's Information Group. Its coverage includes international security issues, state stability, terrorism and insurgency, ongoing conflicts, organized crime, and weapons proliferation.

History

Jane's Soviet Intelligence Review (1989–1991) 
It was first published in January 1989 as Jane's Soviet Intelligence Review, although a pilot edition had been produced in September the previous year and distributed at the Farnborough Airshow in order to test the market. Uniquely for Jane's—and its then parent company, the Thomson Corporation—the magazine carried no advertising but relied on subscription revenue only. It was profitable in its first year of publication and is believed to have remained profitable ever since. Among the first subscribers were the then vice-president of the United States, Dan Quayle, and the author Tom Clancy. Included in the January 1989 issue were articles on the Soviet 2S6 air-defence system, the Soviet Mi-24 helicopter and the new commanding general of the Group of Soviet Forces in Germany, Army General Stanislav Postnikov.

Jane's Intelligence Review (1991–present) 
In 1991 in response to the breakup of the Warsaw Pact, the magazine changed its title to Jane's Intelligence Review although it had already expanded its coverage to include a special report on Iraq in October 1990 following that country's invasion of Kuwait.

In July 1993 it published what is thought to be the first open source reference to "Osameh bin Ladin" who "focused his activities on the military side of jihad and poured millions of dollars into training camps."   In August 2001 it carried a cover feature on Al Qaeda which documented the "genesis, operational methods and organisational structure of the Bin Laden network.

It was also the source of some of the material plagiarized in the Blair government's infamous "Dodgy Dossier" concerning Iraq's alleged weapons of mass destruction.

The magazine in its current form focuses on a range of global security/stability issues, and includes regular features on international security, state stability, terrorism and insurgency, organised crime, and proliferation and procurement. These articles are written by a wide range of expert authors and on-the-ground correspondents.

Editors
 Paul Beaver: pilot issue, 1988
 Henry Dodds: 1989–1992
 Robert Hall
 Peter Felstead
 Christopher Aaron
 Paul Burton
 Christian Le Mière: 2006–2010
 Anna Gilmour: 2010–2012
 Matthew Clements: 2012–2014
 Robert Munks: 2014

References

External links
 www.janes.com/whatwedo

Intelligence websites
Magazines established in 1989
Military magazines published in the United Kingdom
Non-fiction works about espionage
Monthly magazines published in the United Kingdom